The 1987 European Karate Championships, the 22nd edition, was held in Glasgow, Scotland, United Kingdom from 2 to 4 May 1987.

Medallists

Men's Competition

Individual

Team

Women's competition

Individual

Team

References

External links
 Karate Records - European Championship 1987

1987
International sports competitions in Glasgow
European Karate Championship
European championships in 1987
1980s in Glasgow
Karate competitions in the United Kingdom